Gualberto is a given name and surname of Italian origin. Notable people with this name include:

Surname
 Flávio Gualberto (born 1993), Brazilian volleyball player
 João Bosco Gualberto de Freitas, also known Biro-Biro (footballer, born 1974)
 Márcio Gualberto (born 1976)

Given name
 Giovan Gualberto Brunetti (1706–1787), Italian composer
 Giovanni Gualberto Bottarelli, Italian lyricist
 Giovanni Gualberto Magli, Italian castrato
 Gualberto Campos (born 1981), Venezuelan football player
 Gualberto Castro (1934–2019), Mexican singer, actor and television presenter
 Gualberto Fabricio de Vagad, Spanish monk and historian
 Gualberto Fernández (born 1941), Salvadorian football player
 Gualberto García Pérez, Spanish musician
 Gualberto Gutiérrez (born 1940), Uruguayan boxer
 Gualberto Ibarreto (born 1947), Venezuelan folk singer
 Gualberto Jara (born 1959), Paraguayan football manager
 Gualberto Luiz da Silva Júnior (born 1990), Brazilian football player
 Gualberto Mojica (born 1984), Bolivian football player
 Gualberto Piangatelli (1921–2001), Italian historian and archeologist
 Gualberto Ruaño
 Gualberto Vega
 Gualberto Villarroel (1908–1946), Bolivian head of state
 Gualberto do Rosário (born 1950), Cape Verdian politician
 José Gualberto Padilla (1829–1896)
 João Gualberto de Oliveira (1788–1852), Portuguese politician
 Juan Gualberto Espínola González (born 1953), Paraguayan football player
 Juan Gualberto González (1851–1912), Paraguayan politician
 Juan Gualberto Gómez (1854–1933), Cuban revolutionary leader